Heydar Khanish oglu Asadov ( 24 October 1959) — Rector of the Azerbaijan State Maritime Academy (as of April 3, 2019), ex-Minister of Agriculture of the Republic of Azerbaijan, laureate of the Order “For Service to the Fatherland” of the 2nd category (2011), has a Jubilee Medal " 100th Anniversary of the Azerbaijan Democratic Republic (1918-2018) "(2019), laureate of the Order «Shohrat» (2019)

Biography  
Heydar Khanish oglu Asadov was born on October 24, 1959.

In 1978 he graduated from the accounting department of Baku Soviet Commerce College. In 1983 he graduated from the Accounting and Economics Department of the Azerbaijan Institute of National Economy after D. Bunyadzade. In 1978-1984, while studying at the institute, he performed the jobs as an employee, accountant, senior accountant and senior inspector. In 1983-1992 he worked as a lecturer and senior lecturer at the Azerbaijan State Economic Institute. In 1987, he defended his thesis at Moscow State University named M.V. Lomonosov and received the degree of PhD on economic sciences.

From 1992 to 1995, he has been a doctoral student at the University of Marmara, Turkey.

In 1995, by the decree of the President of the Republic of Azerbaijan, he was appointed Deputy Minister of Finance.

From 1996 to 2007 he was the General Director of the State Treasury affiliated to the Ministry of Finance, Deputy Minister of Finance of the Republic of Azerbaijan, in 2007-2013 he served as Chairman of the Accounts Chamber of the Republic of Azerbaijan.

By the decree of the President of the Republic of Azerbaijan dated October 22, 2013 he was appointed Minister of Agriculture.

By the decree of the President of the Republic of Azerbaijan dated April 3, 2019, he was appointed rector of the Azerbaijan State Maritime Academy.

By the corresponding Decrees of the President of the Republic of Azerbaijan in 2011, he was awarded with the Order of “For Service to the Fatherland” of the 2nd degree, in 2019 with the Jubilee Medal “100th Anniversary of the Azerbaijan Democratic Republic (1918-2018)”.

He is the author of 3 monographs and more than 30 scientific papers.

Married. He has three children.

See also 
Ministry of Agriculture (Azerbaijan)

References 

Government ministers of Azerbaijan
1959 births
Living people
Recipients of the Azerbaijan Democratic Republic 100th anniversary medal